Sauble River may refer to:

Sauble River (Ontario), in Bruce County
Big Sable River, also known as the Sauble River, in Michigan

See also
Au Sable River (disambiguation)